Noology, or Noölogy derives from the ancient Greek words νοῦς, nous or "mind" and λόγος, logos. Noology thus outlines a systematic study and organization of thought, knowledge and the mind.

Overview
In the Critique of Pure Reason, Immanuel Kant uses "noology" synonymously with rationalism, distinguishing it from empiricism: 

The Spanish philosopher Xavier Zubiri developed his own notion of noology.

The term is also used to describe the science of intellectual phenomena. It is the study of images of thought, their emergence, their genealogy, and their creation.

See also 
Philosophy of mind
Consciousness studies
Epistemology
Noetics, another term for the same field
Noogenesis
Noogony
Noosphere

Notes and references

External links 
 Noologie.de

Knowledge